The 2010 ABN AMRO World Tennis Tournament was a men's tennis tournament played on indoor hard courts. It was the 38th edition of the event known as the ABN AMRO World Tennis Tournament, and was part of the ATP World Tour 500 series of the 2010 ATP World Tour. It took place at the Rotterdam Ahoy indoor sporting arena in Rotterdam, Netherlands, from 8 February through 14 February 2010. Third-seeded Robin Söderling won the singles title.

The field was led by newly crowned world no. 2 Novak Djokovic, world no. 6, 2010 Qatar ExxonMobil Open champion Nikolay Davydenko and 2009 French Open finalist Robin Söderling. Other players included Gaël Monfils, Tommy Robredo, Mikhail Youzhny and Ivan Ljubičić.

Finals

Singles

 Robin Söderling defeated  Mikhail Youzhny, 6–4, 2–0, ret.
It was Söderling's first title of the year and 5th of his career.

Doubles

 Daniel Nestor /  Nenad Zimonjić defeated  Simon Aspelin /  Paul Hanley, 6–4, 4–6, [10–7]

Entrants

Seeds

1 Rankings as of February 1, 2010.

Other entrants
The following players received wildcards into the main draw:
 Thiemo de Bakker
 Robin Haase
 Robin Söderling

The following players received entry from the qualifying draw:
 Stéphane Bohli
 Andrey Golubev
 Marsel İlhan
 Igor Sijsling

The following player received the lucky loser spot:
 Jan Hájek

References

External links
Official website
ATP tournament profile
ITF tournament edition details

 
ABN AMRO World Tennis Tournament
ABN AMRO World Tennis Tournament
ABN AMRO World Tennis Tournament